RyanDan (born December 5, 1979) is a Canadian musical, songwriting and producing duo, consisting of identical twins Ryan and Dan Kowarsky, whose music is a mix of pop, opera, and classical.

They were originally part of the boy band b4-4 that also included Ohad Einbinder. B4-4 was renamed Before Four for later European releases. The Kowarsky brothers worked later on as a vocal duo known as RyanDan. They have also produced for a number of mainly Canadian artists including Blake McGrath, Shawn Desman, Danny Fernandes, Tyler Medeiros, Mia Martina, Massari and others. They have also appeared as background vocals for Shania Twain in concert.

Beginnings

Identical twins Ryan and Dan Kowarsky were born December 5, 1979, in Cincinnati, Ohio. The youngest of five children in a Jewish family, they grew up in the Thornhill neighbourhood north of Toronto. Their father, Paul, a South African who attended King David Linksfield (a Jewish day school in Johannesburg, South Africa), is an operatic singer who frequently sang as a cantor in synagogues both in South Africa and after immigrating to Canada. Their mother Adele Gould was also instrumental in encouraging them. She was diagnosed with Parkinson's disease in 2004. In high school, Ryan and Dan shared the lead role in their school's production of Joseph and the Amazing Technicolor Dreamcoat.

In b4-4 / Before Four

At age 16, they presented themselves at the offices of Sony Music Canada, and attracted the attention of record company executives when they sang "Show Me the Way to Go Home" in the reception area. They were signed to a record contract soon after forming a boy band called b4-4 along with their friend Ohad Einbinder. They received a Juno Award nomination in 2001 for Best New Group, but lost to Nickelback. They also enjoyed some success in Germany as Before Four.

As RyanDan
They eventually wanted to cultivate a more adult sound and fan base, and in 2006, they moved to London. They recorded their album RyanDan with producer Steve Anderson, who has worked with Kylie Minogue and Paul McCartney. They cite opera singer Mario Lanza as a strong influence on their music.

Their debut self-titled album received critical acclaim including "The Face", which was co-penned by Stephan Moccio and for "Tears of an Angel" written by the duo in memory of their late niece, Tal, who died from a brain tumour at age four while they were recording the album on which it appears.

Their scheduled follow-up album in 2010 entitled Silence Speaks was postponed and never released. The album was renamed Imagine but also failed to be released on schedule in 2011 and then in 2012. One song, "Is Love Enough (To Save the World)" has been released on Canadian radio with an accompanying music video.

Ryan and Dan performed with Shania Twain during her Still The One show at Caesars Palace in Las Vegas which ended in December 2014. They have also performed with her at the Calgary Stampede and at Founders Week in Charlottetown, Prince Edward Island, Canada, on August 30, 2014.

Music production
Ryan and Dan Kowarsky have also devoted their talents to production. Their experience includes songwriting efforts for several tracks on Blake McGrath's Time to Move, including "Relax", Mia Martina's "Latin Moon" and "Stereo Love", "Automatic" by Danny Fernandes, and a number of tracks for Tyler Medeiros.

In popular culture
RyanDan's "Tears of an Angel", written for their niece diagnosed with cancer, was used in a group dance routine by dancers during episode 12 of season 10 of So You Think You Can Dance. The dance was designed by choreographer Bonnie Story who used the piece in an "anti-bullying" dance subject based on an actual bullying incident experienced by a friend of hers.

In 2007, they also appeared on the BBC daytime TV cooking reality show Ready Steady Cook as assistant chefs.

Personal life
Ryan and Dan own a dog boarding camp just north of Toronto called Camp Cookstown.

Discography

Albums

Guest albums 
 2008: "The Water is Wide" (guest vocals) (Olivia Newton-John with Amy Sky and RyanDan) (appears in album A Celebration in Song: Olivia Newton-John & Friends)

Singles

Songwriting and production credits 
2010: "Relax" - Blake McGrath
2010: "Feel It" - Danny Fernandes ft. Shawn Desman
2010: "Girlfriend" - Tyler Medeiros ft. Danny Fernandes
2010: "Automatic" - Danny Fernandes ft. Belly
2011: "Latin Moon" - Mia Martina
2011: "Please Don't Go (Say I Love You)" - Tyler Medeiros
2011: "Stereo Love" - Mia Martina
2013: "Heartbreaker" - Mia Martina
2015: "Guilty as Sin" - Dan Talevski
2015: "My Religion" - Dan Talevski
2016: "Wicked" - Tyler Shaw
2016: "Knock Me Off My Feet" - Dan Talevski
2016: "Rocket" - Dan Talevski
2017: "Birthday Suit" - Dan Talevski
2018: "The Wire" - Dan Talevski
2019: "Home Alone" - Dan Talevski
2019: "If I Ain't Got You" - Dan Talevski
2019: "This Is How We Do It" - Dan Talevski
2019: "Too Close" - Ria Mae with Dan Talevski
2020: "Touch The Sky" - Dan Talevski

References

External links 
 RyanDan.com Official Site

1979 births
Musical groups from Toronto
Canadian pop music groups
Musical groups established in 2006
Canadian musical duos
Jewish Canadian musicians
Canadian twins
Twin musical duos
Identical twin males
2006 establishments in Ontario
Living people
Canadian people of South African descent
Male musical duos